Victoria Argota was a Spanish-Mexican film actress.

Selected filmography
 In the Times of Don Porfirio (1940)
 The Two Orphans (1944)
 Michael Strogoff (1944)
 My Memories of Mexico (1944)
 The Moorish Queen (1955)

References

Bibliography 
 Emilio García Riera. Historia documental del cine mexicano: 1938-1942. University of Guadalajara, 1992.

External links 
 

1884 births
1959 deaths
Mexican film actresses
Spanish emigrants to Mexico